Thirunattalam, also called Nattalam, is a Panchayat town in Kanyakumari district in the Indian State of Tamil Nadu.

Demographics
 2001 India census, Thirunattalam had a population of around 11,037. Males constitute 51% of the population and females 49%. Thirunattalam has an average literacy rate of 79.9%, higher than the national average of 59.5%: male literacy is 81%, and female literacy is 77%.

The village was given the Nirmal Gram Puraskar award in 2006.

Religion 
The last temple of Sivalaya Ottam is in Thirunattalam. On the day of Sivarathri, devotees of Lord Siva finish their 24-hour marathon in Thirunattalam. It is the 12th temple in this marathon.

There are two temples in this village. In the first temple the main god is Lord Vishnu and Lord Siva. The god is therefore called Sankaranarayanar, which means Siva-Vishnu. The idol there is suggesting that Hari (Vishnu) and Haran (Siva) are one and same. In the second temple the main god is Lord Siva and Lord Parvathi. The god is therefore called Arthanareeswara, which means half woman and God. There is a holy tank between these two temples. It is the only temple in Travancore where Brahma's idol is found. There are morning and evening poojas in this temple. On Sivarathri day there are four special Yama Poojas, every two hours from 10 PM. After the fourth yama pooja, by 4 AM, devotees will get Vibhuti and prasada, which indicates their Sivarathri fast is over.

The famous Christian devotee martyr Devasahayam Pillai was born in Nattalam. A church was built in his place of birth and prayers are going regularly. Friday masses are special for the church. The Salvation Army Church is also one of the oldest and small church of Nattalam

Language 
The native language was Malayalam as it was a part of the Princely state of Travancore and was changed to Tamil  after Nattalam became a part of today's Tamil Nadu followed by a riot of linguistical discrimination known as Mahanam lead by Nesamani nadar and his associates.

The nearest city is Thiruvananthapuram which is the capital of Indian state of Kerala and is 48 km away. So, most of the village people speak both Tamil and Malayalam.

Education 
There are schools run by both by the government and privately.

References

Cities and towns in Kanyakumari district